Richard Edward Carey (born 10 January 1928) is a retired United States Marine Corps Lieutenant General.

Early life
He was born on 10 January 1928, in Columbus, Ohio.

Career
He enlisted in the United States Navy's V-5 aviation cadet program in 1945. With the discontinuance of the V-5 program, he was discharged and enlisted in the Marine Corps and advanced to the rank of Sergeant prior to his commissioning as a Second lieutenant in 1948. As a rifle platoon commander, he participated in combat in the Korean War in the 1st Marine Division, including the Battle of Inchon and the Battle of Chosin Reservoir. He earned the Silver Star medal while serving as commander of Weapons Company, 3rd Battalion, 1st Marines on 23 March 1951, prior to his medical evacuation to the United States after being wounded in action.

In 1951, he served for a year as a company commander at the Marine Corps Recruit Depot Parris Island, South Carolina, and then reported to Naval Air Station Pensacola, Florida, for flight training. Since his designation as a Naval Aviator in 1953, Carey held a variety of squadron pilot and staff assignments including separate tours as an intelligence, maintenance, material and logistics officer in both attack and fighter squadrons. He also served as the Assistant G-4 (Logistics) for the 2nd Marine Division and spent one tour as the Aviation Logistics Officer, Office of the Deputy Chief of Staff for Air, Headquarters Marine Corps. He also had a assignments in that area at the squadron, group, wing and air station levels. As a colonel, he also served as the Battle Staff Chief in the Office of the Commander-in-Chief, Pacific and later as the G-3 Officer, Fleet Marine Force, Pacific.

His aviation command experience began in 1958 with Headquarters and Maintenance Squadron 32 while a major, stationed at Marine Corps Air Station Beaufort, South Carolina. As a Lieutenant colonel at Marine Corps Air Station Cherry Point in 1966, General Carey assumed command of Fighter Attack Squadron 513 (VMA-513). Following his assignment to South Vietnam, he commanded Marine Air Base Squadron 13 and later Fighter Attack Squadron 115 (VMA-115) flying the F-4 Phantom in combat operations, while operating from Chu Lai Air Base from 5 October 1967 to 16 January 1968. he then served on the staff of the 1st Marine Aircraft Wing at Da Nang Air Base, South Vietnam. As a Colonel in 1971, he commanded Marine Aircraft Group 24, with the 1st Marine Brigade at Marine Corps Air Station Kaneohe Bay Hawaii.

Following his promotion to Brigadier general on 1 July 1974, he became Assistant Wing Commander, 1st Marine Aircraft Wing, Marine Corps Air Station Iwakuni, Japan. In 1975, he concurrently commanded the 9th Marine Amphibious Brigade where he directed the Marine Corps participation in Operation Frequent Wind, the evacuation of Saigon.

Upon his return to the United States, he served as the Assistant Deputy Chief of Staff for Aviation, Headquarters Marine Corps where he was promoted to Major general on 2 March 1976, and served there until he was assigned duty as Commanding General of the 2nd Marine Aircraft Wing at MCAS Cherry Point, North Carolina, in July 1976. In June 1978 he was assigned duty as Deputy Chief of Staff, Commander in Chief, Atlantic, Naval Station Norfolk, Virginia. He was promoted to Lieutenant General on 24 October 1980 and assumed duty as commanding General, Marine Corps Development & Education Command, Marine Corps Base Quantico, Virginia. He served in this capacity until his retirement on 1 March 1983.

Carey is a graduate of the Naval War College and holds a Bachelor of Science degree in Business Administration from George Washington University.

Later life
Following his retirement from the Marine Corps he has served in various governmental roles including as Administrator, Dallas District Courts from 1990 to 1994, in the Ohio Governor's Cabinet from 1983 to 1987 and as Administrator, Columbus International Airport from 1987 to 1988.

Decorations
In addition to the Silver Star, his awards and decorations include: the Legion of Merit with gold star in lieu of a second award; the Distinguished Flying Cross; the Bronze Star with Combat "V" and gold star in lieu of a second award, the Air Medal with Numeral 15; the Joint Service Commendation Medal; the Purple Heart; the Presidential Unit Citation with two bronze stars; the Navy Unit Commendation with one bronze star; and the Meritorious Unit Commendation.

References

1928 births
Living people
People from Columbus, Ohio
Military personnel from Ohio
United States Marine Corps personnel of the Korean War
Recipients of the Silver Star
United States Naval Aviators
George Washington University School of Business alumni
United States Marine Corps personnel of the Vietnam War
Recipients of the Air Medal
Recipients of the Distinguished Flying Cross (United States)
Naval War College alumni
Recipients of the Legion of Merit
United States Marine Corps generals